Koha Jonë is a newspaper published in Albania. The paper is a politically unaffiliated daily newspaper based in Tirana.

History
The paper was first published on 11 May 1991 by Nikolle Lesi and Aleksandër Frangaj in Lezhë and after some time the headquarters were moved to Tirana. Nikolle Lesi and Alexander Frangaj were the director and chief editor of the paper, respectively.

In 1996, Lesi became sole owner of the paper when he bought out Frangaj, who had owned 40 percent of the shares.

In 1997 the premises of Koha Jonë, at the time Albania’s biggest-circulation daily, were completely burnt down by unknown perpetrators. No one was identified or prosecuted by the authorities in connection with those attacks.

Circulation
Koha Jonë was the largest paper in Albania with a circulation of 34,000 copies in 1992. In 1995 the daily was the second most read newspaper in the country with a circulation of 30,000 copies. The circulation of the paper was 7,833 copies in 2002.

Contents
The newspaper is organised in three sections, including the magazine.
 News: Includes International, National, Tirana, Politics, Business, Technology, Science, Health, Sports, Education.
 Opinion: Includes Editorials, Op-Eds and Letters to the Editor.
 Features: Includes Arts, Movies, Theatre, and music.

Koha Jonë has had a web presence since 2008. Accessing articles requires no registration. The newspaper is available in PDF.

See also
 List of newspapers in Albania
 News in Albania

References

 Albanian Institute for International Studies (AIIS), Tirana. 2003. Albania and European Union: Perceptions and Realities.

External links
Koha Jonë 

1991 establishments in Albania
Albanian-language newspapers
Albanian news websites
Mass media in Lezhë
Mass media in Tirana
Newspapers published in Albania
Publications established in 1991